Young Lions Football Club, commonly known as Young Lions, is a Singaporean developmental football club that competes in the Singapore Premier League. The team is under the direct control of the Football Association of Singapore. The Young Lions are one of the few football clubs in the world which place an age restriction on team members while playing in a top-flight professional league.

The Young Lions plays their league matches at the Jurong West Stadium. Their best S.League finish was third, which they achieved in 2004 and 2006.

Goal
By entering the Young Lions into the S.League, the FAS hopes to expose young players to top-level competition, thus helping to prepare them for international tournaments such as the Southeast Asian Games. While the bulk of the Young Lions squad is made up of members of Singapore's national under-23 team, the club also takes in promising young foreign players (e.g. Luka Savić). However, foreign players are normally only recruited into the Young Lions squad if they could potentially change their nationality to Singaporean and be eligible to play international football for Singapore at some point in the future.

Malaysian domestic competition
In 2011, the Football Association of Singapore and the Football Association of Malaysia reached an agreement that would see greater cooperation between the two nations. One of the intended avenues will see Young Lions play in the Malaysian Super League and Malaysia Cup from 2012 onwards, the first time a Singaporean team has participated in Malaysian domestic football since Singapore won the 1994 M-League and Malaysia Cup double. Although the new Singapore team will have the existing Young Lions set up at its core, the squad will be permitted up to five local players over the age of 14–16 players, as well as a number of overseas players in accordance with the quota set out by the rules of the Malaysian competitions the team will play in.

Ultimately though, a new team was created for the Malaysia league: the LionsXII, while Young Lions remained in the S.League.

National Football Academy
Most of the Young Lions players come from the NFA (National Football Academy) and new players (from the NFA) will be promoted to the Young Lions squad every season.

The National Football Academy enters both the Singapore NFA U-17 and Singapore NFA U-18 teams into the Prime League to allow their players to gain more exposure and match experience by playing against older and more established players.

Performance in domestic competitions

 2003 saw the introduction of penalty shoot-outs if a match ended in a draw in regular time. Winners of penalty shoot-outs gained two points instead of one.

Players

Players on loan

Staff

Source:

See also
Azkals Development Team, a Filipino professional football club whose players also play for the Philippines' national youth teams.

References

External links
 
 S.League website page on Young Lions

 
Football clubs in Singapore
Association football clubs established in 2002
2002 establishments in Singapore
Singapore Premier League clubs